The Kilinochchi Polling Division is a Polling Division in the Jaffna Electoral District, in the Northern Province, Sri Lanka.

Presidential Election Results

Summary 

The winner of Kilinochchi has matched the final country result 2 out of 8 times.

2019 Sri Lankan Presidential Election

2015 Sri Lankan Presidential Election

2010 Sri Lankan Presidential Election

2005 Sri Lankan Presidential Election

1999 Sri Lankan Presidential Election

1994 Sri Lankan Presidential Election

1988 Sri Lankan Presidential Election

1982 Sri Lankan Presidential Election

Parliamentary Election Results

Summary 

The winner of Kilinochchi has matched the final country result 0 out of 7 times.

2015 Sri Lankan Parliamentary Election

2010 Sri Lankan Parliamentary Election

2004 Sri Lankan Parliamentary Election

2001 Sri Lankan Parliamentary Election

2000 Sri Lankan Parliamentary Election

1994 Sri Lankan Parliamentary Election

1989 Sri Lankan Parliamentary Election

Demographics

Ethnicity 

The Kilinochchi Polling Division has a Sri Lankan Tamil majority (97.3%) . In comparison, the Jaffna Electoral District (which contains the Kilinochchi Polling Division) has a Sri Lankan Tamil majority (98.6%)

Religion 

The Kilinochchi Polling Division has a Hindu majority (81.9%) and a significant Roman Catholic population (10.6%) . In comparison, the Jaffna Electoral District (which contains the Kilinochchi Polling Division) has a Hindu majority (82.6%) and a significant Roman Catholic population (12.6%)

References 

Polling Divisions of Sri Lanka
Polling Divisions of the Jaffna Electoral District